Smethwick Cricket Club, founded in 1835, is an amateur cricket club based in Smethwick, Sandwell, England. In 1891, Smethwick Cricket Club joined the Birmingham and District Cricket League. Smethwick have five Senior XI teams: The 1st XI play in the Birmingham & District Premier League Premier Division, and the 2nd, 3rd and 4th XI compete in the Warwickshire County Cricket League. Smethwick CC also have a Sunday XI that play in the Arden Sunday Cricket League, and an established junior section that plays competitive cricket in the Warwickshire Youth Cricket Leagues. Smethwick have been Birmingham and District Premier League Champions on 3 occasions in 1951, 1968 and 2022.

International players
International players who have played for the club include: Azhar Mahmood, Mohammad Akram, Mohammad Yousuf, Wasim Akram, Kabir Ali, Mike Rindel and Steve Waugh.

See also
Club cricket

References

External links
 Wasim Akram at Smethwick: Documentary (Part 1 of 2) 1999
 Wasim Akram at Smethwick: Documentary (Part 2 of 2) 1999
 Smethwick Cricket Club website

English club cricket teams
1835 establishments in England
Club cricket
Smethwick